The 2018 Copa América Femenina was the eighth edition of the CONMEBOL Copa América Femenina (also referred to as the Copa América Femenina), the quadrennial international football competition for women's national teams in South America affiliated with CONMEBOL. The tournament was played between 4 and 22 April 2018 in Chile.

The tournament provided two direct qualifying places and a play-off place (against the fourth-placed team from CONCACAF) for the 2019 FIFA Women's World Cup in France, one direct qualifying place and a play-off place (against the second-placed team from CAF) for the 2020 Summer Olympic women's football tournament in Japan, and three (teams finishing third to fifth) for the 2019 Pan American Games women's football tournament in Lima, besides Peru who qualified automatically as hosts.

Brazil defended successfully their title winning all their matches. It was their seventh Copa América Femenina title.

Host selection
Chile were named hosts in April 2017. Dates were announced on 21 July 2017.

Teams
All ten CONMEBOL member national teams entered the tournament.

Venues
On 25 October 2017, the ANFP announced that 3 cities would host the tournament, all of them within the Coquimbo Region.

On 28 March 2018, CONMEBOL announced that the city of Ovalle would no longer host matches, and matches originally to be played at Estadio Diaguita on 8 and 11 April would be moved to La Serena and Coquimbo respectively.

Draw
The draw of the tournament was held on 1 March 2018, 13:00 CLST (UTC−3), at the ANFP Auditorium in Santiago, Chile. The ten teams were drawn into two groups of five teams. The hosts Chile and the defending champions Brazil were seeded into Groups A and B respectively, while the remaining teams were placed into four "pairing pots" according to their results in the 2014 Copa América Femenina.

Squads

Each team could register a maximum of 22 players (three of whom must be goalkeepers).

Match officials
A total of 12 referees and 20 assistant referees were selected for the tournament.

First stage
In the first stage, the teams were ranked according to points (3 points for a win, 1 point for a draw, 0 points for a loss). If tied on points, tiebreakers would be applied in the following order (Regulations Article 18.1):
Goal difference;
Goals scored;
Head-to-head result in games between tied teams;
Drawing of lots.

The top two teams of each group advanced to the final stage.

All times are local, CLST (UTC−3).

Group A

Group B

Ranking of group third place
The overall fifth-placed team in the first stage qualified for the 2019 Pan American Games.

Final stage
In the final stage, the teams were ranked according to points (3 points for a win, 1 point for a draw, 0 points for a loss). If tied on points, tiebreakers would be applied in the following order, taking into account only matches in the final stage (Regulations Article 18.2):
Goal difference;
Goals scored;
Head-to-head result in games between tied teams;
Fair play points (first yellow card: minus 1 point; second yellow card / red card: minus 3 points; direct red card: minus 4 points; yellow card and direct red card: minus 5 points);
Drawing of lots.

Goalscorers

Awards

Top goalscorer:  Catalina Usme (9 goals)
Fair play award:

Qualification for international tournaments

Qualified teams for FIFA Women's World Cup
The following three teams from CONMEBOL qualified for the 2019 FIFA Women's World Cup. Argentina qualified by winning the play-off against the 2018 CONCACAF Women's Championship fourth-placed team, Panama.

1 Bold indicates champions for that year. Italic indicates hosts for that year.

Qualified teams for Summer Olympics
The following two teams from CONMEBOL qualified for the 2020 Summer Olympic women's football tournament. Chile qualified after they won the play-off against the 2020 CAF Women's Olympic Qualifying Tournament second-placed team, Cameroon.

2 Bold indicates champions for that year. Italic indicates hosts for that year.

Qualified teams for Pan American Games
The following four teams from CONMEBOL qualified for the 2019 Pan American Games women's football tournament, including Peru which qualified as hosts.

3 Bold indicates champions for that year. Italic indicates hosts for that year.

References

External links

Copa América Femenina Chile 2018, CONMEBOL.com 

 
2018
2018 in South American football
2019 FIFA Women's World Cup qualification
2018 in women's association football
Qualification tournaments for the 2019 Pan American Games
Football at the 2020 Summer Olympics – Women's qualification
April 2018 sports events in South America
2018 in Chilean football
2018 in Chilean women's sport
International association football competitions hosted by Chile
Argentina at the 2019 FIFA Women's World Cup
Brazil at the 2019 FIFA Women's World Cup
Chile at the 2019 FIFA Women's World Cup